= Hattarwat =

- Village
- Country: India
- State: Karnataka
- District: Belgaum
- Talukas: Chikodi

Languages
  - Official: Kannada
- Time zone: UTC+5:30 (IST)

Hattarwat is a village located in Chikodi taluka in the Belgaum District in the southern state of Karnataka, India. It is also called the green valley of Chikodi. It is 1,000 metres (3,300 feet) above sea level.
